Diego Matias Hypólito (born 19 June 1986) is a Brazilian gymnast, the 2005 and 2007 World Champion in the floor exercise. He is the first male gymnast from Brazil, and South America, to win a medal at the World Championships. He also won 63 medals in the World Cup. Hypólito has represented Brazil at the 2008, 2012 and 2016 Olympic Games. He received the silver medal in floor exercise at the 2016 Olympic Games. 

He is the brother of Daniele Hypólito, the first Brazilian gymnast to win a medal at the World Championships.

Early life 
Hypólito was born in Santo André, São Paulo, but moved to the city of Rio de Janeiro. He is the son of a bus driver, Wagner Hypólito, and a seamstress, Geni Matias. He has Greek ancestry through his father (the surname Hypólito comes from the Greek surname Hippolyte, which was translated when his ancestors had immigrated to Brazil); he is also of Portuguese descent, through his mother.

As a child, he had his first contact with the sport at the Flamengo Rowing Club, the same one his sister, Daniele, used to train. At her insistence, he specialized in solo exercises, in which he won his first titles as infantil and later as júnior.

Career 
Hypólito began gymnastics at age seven, following in his older sister's footsteps. He won the floor exercise event in the children's division at 1997's Brazilian National Championships and was 2001's all-around junior national champion.

By the age of 21, Hypólito had competed at the 2002, 2003, 2005, 2006 and the 2007 World Championships. A floor exercise specialist, he qualified for the FX event finals in all five competitions, placing fifth in 2002, fourth in 2003, earning a gold medal in 2005, a silver medal in 2006, and a gold again in 2007. With his 2005 win, Hypólito became the first male South American gymnast to medal at the World Championships.

In the spring of 2008, Hypólito contracted dengue fever. However, he was able to recover and resume training in time to compete at the 2008 Olympics in Beijing, where he was Brazil's only MAG representative. In the preliminary round of competition, he performed on floor and vault, and qualified to the floor event final in first place with a score of 15.950. In the floor finals, he fell on his last tumbling pass to finish the meet in sixth place.

Hypólito was one of three male Brazilians in artistic gymnastics at the 2012 Summer Olympics, but he was eliminated during the qualification stage. However, in the 2016 Summer Olympics, held in his home country, he finished fourth in qualification for the floor exercise, and won a silver medal in the individual event final.

Eponymous skills 
Hypólito has one skill on floor exercise officially named after him called the Hypólito on floor, which was successfully completed when he won the gold medal on the individual floor event at the 2006 FIG Artistic Gymnastics World Cup Final in São Paulo, Brazil, defeating the then reigning Olympic floor champion, Kyle Shewfelt of Canada, in the process. The skill is a full-twisting Arabian double (front) layout and was assigned a D-score of F (0.6).

Personal life 
Hypólito came out as gay in May 2019. In an article for UOL Esporte, Hypólito described many years of struggling with his sexuality because of his deeply religious upbringing, but wrote, "I want people to know that I'm gay and that I'm not ashamed of it."

References

External links 

 
  
 Profile at International Gymnast magazine 
 

1986 births
Living people
Brazilian Protestants
People from Santo André, São Paulo
Brazilian people of Greek descent
Brazilian people of Portuguese descent
Brazilian male artistic gymnasts
LGBT gymnasts
Brazilian LGBT sportspeople
LGBT Protestants
Gay sportsmen
World champion gymnasts
Medalists at the World Artistic Gymnastics Championships
Gymnasts at the 2003 Pan American Games
Gymnasts at the 2007 Pan American Games
Gymnasts at the 2008 Summer Olympics
Gymnasts at the 2011 Pan American Games
Gymnasts at the 2012 Summer Olympics
Gymnasts at the 2016 Summer Olympics
Olympic gymnasts of Brazil
Originators of elements in artistic gymnastics
Pan American Games gold medalists for Brazil
Pan American Games silver medalists for Brazil
Olympic silver medalists for Brazil
Medalists at the 2016 Summer Olympics
Olympic medalists in gymnastics
Pan American Games medalists in gymnastics
South American Games gold medalists for Brazil
South American Games medalists in gymnastics
Competitors at the 2010 South American Games
LGBT Pentecostals
Medalists at the 2011 Pan American Games
21st-century LGBT people
Sportspeople from São Paulo (state)